Al Shearer (born August 14, 1977) is an American actor.  He portrayed Nevil Shed in the 2006 Disney blockbuster Glory Road, produced by Jerry Bruckheimer. Shearer might be best known for his role on the MTV series Punk'd, or as "Hits" - host of the once-popular BET series Hits from the Street.

Shearer was born in Columbus, Ohio. Hits began his humble career at BET as the host of a show titled, "Game Room." Later, he honed his skills in front of the camera as the DC correspondent for the award-winning teen show, Teen Summit. He would then go on to host a morning hip-hop show at WPGC-FM/AM (CBS Radio) in Washington, DC. However, it is his 'you so crazy' personality that draws attention to his very candid, yet comedic, persona which he portrays easily on as well as off camera. Hits has also been featured in a Reebok commercial with 2000 NBA rookie of the year, Steve Francis.

Hits earned a B.A. in Broadcast Journalism from Howard University and presently resides in the Los Angeles area.  He is currently the host of the BET prank show, Played by Fame.

He is also married to Model and Actress Niresha Kalaichelvam.

Filmography

External links
 

1977 births
Living people
African-American male actors
American male film actors
Male actors from Columbus, Ohio
21st-century African-American people
20th-century African-American people